Pandrikku Nandri Solli is a 2022 Indian Tamil-language black comedy film directed by Bala Aran and produced by Vignesh Selvaraj under the banner Head Media Works. The film stars Joe Malloori and newcomers Nishanth and Vijay Sathya in the lead roles. The film's music is composed by Suren Vikhash, with cinematography handled by Vignesh Selvaraj himself and editing done by duo- Ram and Sathiesh. The film was titled from a phrase of a Tamil riddle and it became popular after actor Vadivelu used in his dialogue in Imsai Arasan 23rd Pulikecei. The film was released via OTT platform Sony LIV on 4 February 2022.

Cast
 Joe Malloori
 Nishanth as Devaraj 
 Vijay Sathya
 Balaji Rathinam
 Chella as Jaffer 
 Viyan
 Baskar
 Auto Chandran

Release
The film was released via OTT platform Sony LIV on 4 February 2022.

Reception 
The film was released via OTT platform Sony LIV on 4 February 2022. M Suganth Critic from the Times of India gave 2 stars out of 5 stars and noted that "A Film With Interesting Ideas but Lacklustre Execution ". Maalaimalar critic said " The plot of the film revolves around a rare treasure hunt in Tamil cinema.". Dinamalar critic gave a mixture of review

References

External links 
 
Indian black comedy films
Indian direct-to-video films
2022 direct-to-video films